Acalolepta vitalisi is a species of beetle in the family Cerambycidae. It was described by Maurice Pic in 1925. It is known from China, Vietnam, and Cambodia.

References

Acalolepta
Beetles described in 1925